Mark DeCarlo is an American actor, television host, comedian, travel, internet personality, and foodie expert. He is currently known for being a contributor to WLS-TV morning show Windy City Live, a locally produced Chicago program that replaced The Oprah Winfrey Show following its 2011 ending. DeCarlo has been awarded three local Emmy Awards for his work on Windy City Live.

DeCarlo's first major exposure came in 1991 when he became host of the dating game show Studs. He is also known for providing the voice of Hugh Neutron, the title character's father in The Adventures of Jimmy Neutron, Boy Genius for Nickelodeon and for portraying Alec Berg in the Seinfeld episode, “The Face Painter”. Mark authored “A Fork on the Road: 400 Cities, 1 Stomach” which is a comedic travelogue & cook book published by Lyons Press.

DeCarlo rose to influencer-style fame on the internet in July 2021 when Hugh Neutron gained a meme-centric cult following, in attempt to get the Jimmy Neutron character into the Nickelodeon All-Star Brawl video game.

Career

Acting
Prior to Studs, DeCarlo was a host on the cable network MovieTime before it became E! Entertainment Television. Early in his career, DeCarlo was a contestant on Sale of the Century, winning $115,257 in cash and prizes in 1985, and Tic Tac Dough in 1990. He also guest-starred as himself in an episode of Jonas and is now a regular on Windy City Live, a local morning show in the Chicago market.

Mark hosted two more TV shows, Fox's extreme game show, Big Deal, and FX's late night talk show The X Show. He appeared on the game show Street Smarts in 2002, playing against Mark L. Walberg as part of a "Game Show Showdown", and lost the game with $1 to Walberg's $2. Since it was a charity episode, he still earned $500 for the M.S. Society of America. In 2005, DeCarlo starred in Sex Sells: The Making of Touché.

DeCarlo appeared on an episode of the show Interior Therapy with Jeff Lewis on Bravo that aired May 16, 2012. He co-hosted the TV series THIS vs THAT that premiered internationally in November 2012. He also had a small role on HBO's Curb Your Enthusiasm.
In 2013, he hosted EconomicalECO, a how-to series that popularized ways to radically reduce the cost of living by choosing economical American products.

On a 1992 episode of Studs, DeCarlo hosted Ronald Goldman, at the time an aspiring actor who become well known 2 years later after being murdered along with Nicole Brown Simpson in Los Angeles on June 12, 1994, which led to the arrest and Trial of O.J. Simpson.

Voice over acting
DeCarlo was the voice of Hugh Neutron on the Nickelodeon computer animated series The Adventures of Jimmy Neutron, Boy Genius. His voice over career includes animated stints on Back at the Barnyard, Planet Sheen, Johnny Bravo, Handy Manny and the Thumb series of comedies: Thumb Wars, BaTThumb and Thumbtanic.

Travel & foodie expert
Mark hosted the Travel Channel's Taste of America with Mark DeCarlo for two seasons in 2004 and 2005, and is also known as the host of the early 1990s dating game show, Studs and the short-lived 1996 game show Big Deal.

In September 2022, DeCarlo and his wife, Yeni Álvarez, resumed travel for their podcast, A Fork on the Road, which they began in 2017 but set aside due to the Covid-19 Pandemic.

Internet icon
Mark hosts an internet sitcom called The Boffo the Bear Show, via Facebook Live and YouTube. Mark portrays a pompous blue bear in Hollywood who runs his own interview talk show and game show. The realtime-CGI technology created for Boffo was programmed by Julian Sarmiento, Global Director of Virtual Production and Real-Time at FuseFX. Mark has held several interview panels with his Boffo character using this technology at comic-con conventions.

On July 13, 2021, GameMill Entertainment announced Nickelodeon All-Star Brawl, a platform-fighter video game for Fall 2021. The same day as the announcement trailer, the hashtag "#HughNation" and Hugh Neutron began to trend on Twitter, as memes of Mark's character becoming a playable fighter in the video game circulated. What started as a joke began to build a serious cult following for DeCarlo's character to be included. As a result, a Discord server for Mark's fanbase got Mark himself involved, in which he fueled the community's desire for the character to be added. Mark further interacted with his fans by reading submitted memes via Twitter, and later through his Cameo page.

On May 13, 2022, GameMill Entertainment released a reveal trailer for Nickelodeon All-Star Brawl'''s newest DLC fighters, including Hugh Neutron, which DeCarlo and his fanbase had been rallying for since the game's reveal. On August 5th, 2022, Hugh Neutron released as a paid downloadable fighter for the game. On the DLC's release day, DeCarlo and Debi Derryberry commentated a Nickelodeon All-Star Brawl'' tournament, consisting of twelve online content creators.

Personal life
DeCarlo graduated from Benet Academy in 1980. He graduated from University of California, Los Angeles. He married voice actress Yeni Álvarez on November 24, 2012. Being a Chicago native, he is also an avid Chicago Cubs fan as well and is often seen wearing various Cub merchandise.

References

External links
DeCarlo Entertainment
Mark DeCarlo tells his story of losing seventy pounds
Mark DeCarlo at Voices.com

Male actors from Chicago
Contestants on American game shows
American game show hosts
Drake University alumni
Living people
Year of birth missing (living people)